Brenden Harding Jones (born May 31, 1974) is an American politician and entrepreneur from the state of North Carolina. He is a member of the North Carolina House of Representatives from the Republican Party, representing the 46th district. He was first elected in November 2016.

Early life 

Jones was born on May 31, 1974 in Lumberton, North Carolina to Ferrell Jones Sr. and Diane Stevens Jones, and grew up in Tabor City, North Carolina. Rather than attending the racially diverse local school like his popular older brother, he was sent to the tiny private Waccamaw Academy, that was almost exclusively white, in Whiteville, North Carolina. This was because he was a overweight child subject to intense bullying. Waccamaw Academy, a small private school which opened in 1968 in response to local public school desegregation, closed in 2012. The academy was founded so local wealthier families could keep their children from attending school with black students. He graduated from there in 1992.  During his senior year, he worked part-time at his family's small used car business. 
After graduation from high school, his father paid for him to attend Fayetteville Technical Community College.  He received an associate's Degree in Mortuary Sciences.  In 1994 Jones moved to Greenville, North Carolina to work in the funeral industry for a total of one year. Why he left this very lucrative field has not been explained.  

Failing in his chosen field, he went to work for a company making trailer homes in 1995. He lasted there for only four years. In 1999, he returned to Tabor City where he went back to work for his dad. He sold used cars at the family's very small used car lot, Ready Motors Inc(established in 1972). The car lot staff was Jones' father(president), Jones' mother(secretary/bookkeeper), Jones' brother(VP), himself, and a employee who came and washed cars once a week. Jones was given the same title as his brother, and dubbed vice-president of the used car lot, which was also his title when he "worked" there in high school. The average inventory for the lot is 7-10 cars. He has sold used cars up to the present day. In Oct. 2011 Jones also started an auto body shop. This experience was described as him being a successful businessman and "job creator" in campaign materials.  In 2020, he became co-owner of Ready Truck Auto and RV, another Jones family-owned used vehicle dealership in Lumberton, NC. In Gallup polls of trustworthiness in professions in the US, the two which rank the lowest are Congressman and used car salesman, of which Jones is both.

When just a youth of twenty years old, he married, Angela Cox, on December 17, 1994. They have been married almost 30 years.  They have two daughters, Savannah-Grace and Ella. Daughter Savannah-Grace Jones, is a student at Campbell University, a private Southern Baptist University.  While she was in high school, her father secured her nepotistic positions as a page in the NC House of Representatives at 14 years old(2017), as well as jobs in the NC Senate at 15(2018) and the Lt. Governor's Office at 17(2020). Jones' youngest daughter graduated eighth grade in 2021 from Williams Township School although the Jones family resided in the jurisdiction of the Tabor City school system. Ella is looking forward to many nepotistic positions to be a page and to intern in State Government positions just like her older sister that Jones will provide to pad her resume when time to apply to college.

He and his family attend the Beaverdam Original Freewill Baptist Church, in the rural community of Beaverdam, near Chadbourn, North Carolina, 13 miles from his home.  He was formerly a lifelong member of Tabor City Baptist Church, 1/2 mile from his home.  He grew up in this church as his parents joined it when they moved to Tabor City. There he served as a Deacon, Chairman of the Building and Grounds Committee and three terms on the Finance Committee.  He left there due a scandal over the unauthorized use of the church's newsletter for campaign purposes. This act jeopardized the church's status as a nonprofit entity.

Prior to running for office in 2014, Jones was a past member of the Columbus County Board of Elections and served as the board’s chairman.  He was on the county board from Jul 2011-Nov 2013.

Beginning in July 2015, Jones was  a member of the Board of Trustees at Southeastern Community College, Whiteville, NC.   As of 2021, due to unexplained reasons, he was no longer a trustee.

Political career 
Jones has participated in the 2014, 2016, 2018, and 2020 general elections for NC House of Representatives District 46.  In 2020, NC House District 46 had a population of 70,246. The racial makeup of NC District 46 is 47% White(12% Hispanic ethnicity), 23.4% Black, 15.6% Native America, and 0.3% Asian. NC District 46 is the result of partisan gerrymandering.
After losing his first election, the NC Republican Party infused his next campaign with nearly $149K to help him win the seat in the rural 46th Distinct.   It is unclear why such an unimportant rural district would need such a massive influx of cash to elect a state representative, or what is expected for this cash infusion. In 2022, Jones ran unopposed in the election.

Jones has his own Political Action Committee(PAC), the Committee to Elect Brenden Jones, which channels money from the NC Republican Party to Jones and other Republican candidates. 
On June 25, 2021, he co-sponsored the Feed the Farmer Drop-In Appreciation Lunch in Tabor City in conjunction with the North Carolina Yam Festival .  The North Carolina Yam Festival is an agricultural-based festival that celebrates the hard work and dedication of the area's humble farmers.  This event was located at Mama’s Restaurant, 101 Hickman Road.  Hot dogs, chips, Moon-Pies, and a RC Cola were given to farmers who pre-registered for the event.

He has sponsored numerous bills relating to motor vehicles which could benefit him as a used car salesman.

After being appointed to the Energy and Public Utilities Committee, Jones received a campaign donation of $8,600.00 by Duke Energy Corp PAC.  On 21 Jan 2023, Duke Energy announced it is seeking a rate increase for customers throughout its NC service area, which includes Jones' district. Duke Energy has had profits over $20 Billion for the each of the past 10 years, which is due to constant rate increases. The rate increases are a transfer of money from Duke Energy customers to their shareholders.

Jones has voiced his opposition to covid-19 vaccine mandates, even for healthcare systems in NC.  He voted to end federal unemployment benefits linked to the covid-19 pandemic relief for workers.

Election results 

Jones first ran for a seat in the NC House of Representatives in 2014 and lost to incumbent Kenneth Waddell(D). A primary election took place on May 6, 2014. The general election took place on November 4, 2014. The signature filing deadline for candidates wishing to run in this election was February 28, 2014. Incumbent Ken Waddell was unopposed in the Democratic primary, while Brenden Jones was unopposed in the Republican primary. Waddell defeated Jones in the general election. 
2014
Jones' website highlighted the following campaign themes:
Keeping Taxes Low,
Reining in Government Spending,
Supporting our Teachers,
Stimulating Private-Sector Job Growth,
Fighting for Rural Transportation,
Standing Strong for Our Values,

Democratic Ken Waddell Incumbent	53.4%	11,551
Republican Brenden Jones	        46.6%	10,073   Vote totals 21,624

North Carolina House of Representatives elections, 2020

Brenden Jones (R)	 60.7% 	17,555
Tim Heath (D)	     39.3% 	11,369
               Total votes: 28,924
<

North Carolina House of Representatives

Standing or select committees (2019–2020 session)
 Appropriations, Information Technology, Chairman
 House select Committee on Disaster Relief, Chairman
 Appropriations, Vice-chairman
 Energy and Public Utilities, Vice-chairman
 Agriculture
 House Select Committee on COVID-19

Non-standing committees (2019–2020 session)
 Joint Legislative Commission on Governmental Operations
 Joint Legislative Oversight Committee on Information Technology
 Joint Legislative Commission on Energy Policy
 Joint Legislative Emergency Management Oversight Committee
 Joint Select Committee on Storm-Related River Debris/Damage in North Carolina, Co-chair

2021-2022 Session</ref>https://ballotpedia.org/Brenden_Jones</ref></ref>https://fastdemocracy.com/bill-search/nc/legislators/NCL000223/</ref></ref>https://repjonesfornc.com/leadership</ref>

Jones was assigned to the following committees:
 Appropriations on Information Technology Committee,
 Appropriations on Transportation Committee, Senior chair,(Campaign donations of $11,200.00 by NC Auto Dealers Assn PAC & $8,800.00 by Carolinas Independent * Automobile Dealers Association NC PAC)</ref>https://www.transparencyusa.org/nc/candidate/brenden-jones/contributors</ref>
 Energy and Public Utilities Committee,(Campaign donation of $8,600.00 by Duke Energy Corp PAC which is seeking a rate increase for customers)</ref>https://www.transparencyusa.org/nc/candidate/brenden-jones/contributors</ref>
 Federal Relations and American Indian Affairs Committee, Vice chair,
 Rules, Calendar, and Operations of the House Committee, Vice chair,
 Agriculture Committee,
 Appropriations Committee, Vice chair,
 House Transportation Committee, Chair</ref>https://repjonesfornc.com/leadership</ref></ref>https://www.transparencyusa.org/nc/candidate/brenden-jones/contributors</ref>

Notable legislation

Numerous bills have been sponsored by Jones. 
NC H294 - Sale of Salvage Vehicles,(benefits used car dealers like Jones)(Campaign donations of $11,200.00 by NC Auto Dealers Assn PAC & $8,800.00 by Carolinas Independent Automobile Dealers Association NC PAC)</ref>https://www.transparencyusa.org/nc/candidate/brenden-jones/contributors</ref>
NC H91 - Accountability and Fair Play in Athletics,
NC H165 - DOT Legislative Changes.-AB,
NC H264 - Emergency Powers Accountability Act,
NC H403 - Clarify Motor Vehicle Franchise Laws,(benefits used car dealers like Jones)(Campaign donations of $11,200.00 by NC Auto Dealers Assn PAC & $8,800.00 by Carolinas Independent Automobile Dealers Association NC PAC)</ref>https://www.transparencyusa.org/nc/candidate/brenden-jones/contributors</ref>
NC H974 - Honor Jerry Carter, Former Member,
NC H650 - Omnibus DMV Bill,(benefits used car dealers like Jones)(Campaign donations of $11,200.00 by NC Auto Dealers Assn PAC & $8,800.00 by Carolinas Independent Automobile Dealers Association NC PAC)</ref>https://www.transparencyusa.org/nc/candidate/brenden-jones/contributors</ref>
NC H692 - Restrict Certain Vehicle Modifications, "Carolina Squat Truck Ban"(benefits used car dealers like Jones)
NC H453 - Human Life Nondiscrimination Act/No Eugenics,
NC H83 - Eliminate Income Tax for Military Retirees,
NC H500 - Disaster Relief and Mitigation Act of 2021,
NC H947 - The G.R.E.A.T. Broadband Expansion Act,
NC H217 - Utilities Comm'n Tech. and Add'l Changes,
NC H712 - Preservation of Workforce Housing,
NC H900 - Support Lumbee Recognition Act,
NC H807 - Uniformed Heroes Voting Act,
NC H535 - Firefighters Fighting Cancer Act of 2021,
NC H100 - Highway Cleanup Act of 2021,
NC H622 - AeroX Funding/UAS Integration Pilot Program,
NC H32 - Equity in Opportunity Act,
NC H497 - Support Veteran Teachers,
NC H190 - Vacancies/Rowland & Mayor's Term/Red Springs,
NC H36 - Protect Those Who Serve and Protect Act,
NC H323 - Military Readiness and Rural Resilience Act,
NC H283 - Connor's Law
</ref>https://www.transparencyusa.org/nc/candidate/brenden-jones/contributors</ref>

References

1974 births
Living people
People from Tabor City, North Carolina
Republican Party members of the North Carolina House of Representatives
21st-century American politicians